The 1917–18 Coupe de France (officially Coupe Charles–Simon 1917–18) was the first season of the most prestigious cup competition in France.
The competition was open to all clubs who were affiliated with an organisation that was a member of the Comité français interfédéral (CFI).  The cup was named after Charles Simon, the Secretary-General of the CFI at the outbreak of World War I, who died in battle in 1915.

Forty-eight clubs competed in the cup and Olympique Pantin defeated FC Lyon 3–0 in the final.

First round 

Teams from the north and east of France were unable to compete due to World War I. Thirty-two teams competed in this round with sixteen others being given byes to the next round. The matches were played on a regional basis on 7 October 1917.

Notes
Note 1: British Aviation were disqualified after a protest from the Union des Sociétés Françaises de Sports Athlétiques.  Vitry qualified for the Second round.
Note 2: The match was due to be played at Le Mans but they had the match postponed and the tie is reversed. Bretagne had the match on 14 October postponed. The CFI award the match to the Cadets.
Note 3: Monaco had the game postponed to 21 October but withdraw due to a lack of players.  The FFF website announced the result as 7–0 to Marseille.

Second round 

The sixteen teams that received a bye joined the sixteen winners of the First Round. The matches were played on 4 November 1917 and on a regional basis if possible.

Second round first replays 

The matches were played on 18 November 1917.

Second round second replay 

The match was played on 25 November 1917.

Third round 

The matches were played on 2 December 1917.

Quarterfinals 

The matches were played on 3 February 1918. FC Lyon-Stade Rennais was played at a neutral venue.

Semifinals 

The semifinals were both played on 3 March 1918 at neutral venues.

Final

References 

1917-18
1917–18 in French football